Mission La Paz was established by the Jesuit missionaries Juan de Ugarte and Jaime Bravo in 1720 and financed by the Marqués de Villapuente de la Peña, at the location of the modern city of La Paz, Baja California Sur, Mexico.

La Paz was the location of the earliest Spanish activity in Baja California, and was frequently the site of conflicts between the Spanish and the local Guaycura and Pericú Indians. Fortún Ximénez, mutineer on an expedition sent by Hernán Cortéz, landed at La Paz in 1533. Two years later, Cortés himself led a large party that attempted but failed to establish a settlement. Sebastián Vizcaíno in 1596 gave it its anomalously pacific name. Isidro de Atondo y Antillón and Eusebio Francisco Kino attempted to establish a mission settlement in 1683 but again failed because of conflicts with the native inhabitants. When Jesuit missions finally took root in Baja California after 1697, the initial focus of activity was to the north, in the area around Loreto.

The Jesuits finally returned to the site of Airapí (probably a Guaycura name) in 1720, in coordinated expeditions from Loreto that traveled both by sea (under Ugarte and Bravo) and overland (under Clemente Guillén). The mission had little success, however. It was sacked in the Pericú Revolt of 1734 and finally abandoned in 1748, when its Indian neophytes were relocated to Todos Santos.

See also

 
 List of Jesuit sites

References
 León-Portilla, Miguel. 1970. Testimonios sudcalifornianos: nueva entrada y establicimiento en el puerto de la Paz, 1720. Universidad Nacional Autónoma de México, Mexico City.
 Vernon, Edward W. 2002. Las Misiones Antiguas: The Spanish Missions of Baja California, 1683–1855. Viejo Press, Santa Barbara, California.

Missions in Baja California Sur
Loreto Municipality (Baja California Sur)
1720 establishments in New Spain